(),  or , are a honey-sweetened German cake molded cookie or bar cookie that has become part of Germany's Christmas traditions. It is similar to gingerbread.

Etymology 
The etymology of Leb- in the term  is uncertain. Proposed derivations include: from the Latin libum (flat bread), from the Germanic word Laib (loaf), and from the Germanic word lebbe (very sweet). Another likely possibility is that it comes from the old term , the rather solid crystallized honey taken from the hive, that cannot be used for much beside baking.

History 

Bakers noticed that honey-sweetened dough would undergo a natural fermentation process when stored in a cool location for several weeks, creating air bubbles that would improve the quality of the bread.  was started in November and baked in December after undergoing this fermentation period.

 was invented by monks in Franconia, Germany, in the 13th century.  bakers were recorded as early as 1296 in Ulm, and 1395 in Nürnberg (Nuremberg).

Local history in Nuremberg relates that emperor Friedrich III held a Reichstag there in 1487 and he invited the children of the city to a special event where he presented Lebkuchen bearing his printed portrait to almost four thousand children. Historically, and due to differences in the ingredients,  is also known as "honey cake" (Honigkuchen) or "pepper cake" (Pfefferkuchen). Traditionally, the cookies are usually quite large and may be  in diameter if round, and larger if rectangular. Unlike other cities where women could bake and sell the holiday cookies at will, in Nuremberg only members of the baker's guild were allowed to bake the cookies.

Since 1808, a variety of Nürnberg Lebkuchen made without flour has been called . It is uncertain whether Elise was the daughter of a gingerbread baker or the wife of a margrave. Her name is associated with some of the Lebkuchen produced by members of the guild. Since 1996, Nürnberger Lebkuchen is a protected designation of origin, meaning that it must be produced within the boundaries of the city.

Types
 range in taste from spicy to sweet and come in a variety of shapes with round being the most common. The ingredients usually include honey, spices such as aniseed, cardamom, coriander, cloves, ginger, and allspice, nuts including almonds, hazelnuts, and walnuts, or candied fruit.

This was an idea of the monks, who used unleavened communion wafer ingredients to prevent the dough from sticking. Typically, they are glazed or covered with very dark chocolate or a thin sugar coating, but some are left uncoated.

They are also sold as souvenirs at the Oktoberfest and are inscribed with affectionate, sarcastic or obscene messages.

Another form is the "witch's house" ( or ), made popular because of the fairy tales about Hansel and Gretel.

The closest German equivalent of the gingerbread man is the Honigkuchenpferd ("honey cake horse").

The finest artisan  bakeries in Nuremberg boast close to 40% nut content.  is sometimes packaged in richly decorated tins, chests, and boxes, which have become nostalgic collector items.

Several Swiss regional varieties also exist and have been declared part of the Culinary Heritage of Switzerland, such as the case with Berner Honiglebkuchen.

Gallery

See also 

 Aachener Printen
 Basler Läckerli
 Berner Haselnusslebkuchen
 Springerle
 Speculaas
 List of chocolate-covered foods
 List of German desserts
 Licitar
 Pfeffernüsse

References

External links 

 Lebkuchen on the German Food Guide
 Germans fall out of love with Lebkuchen at The Guardian
 593 Lebkuchen recipes on Chefkoch.de as of 4 March 2013 
  

Christmas food
Christmas in Germany
Culinary Heritage of Switzerland
Biscuits
Anise
Chocolate-covered foods
Nut dishes
Fermented foods
German breads
Cookies
German cakes
Ginger dishes
Honey dishes
Honey cakes